In Islam, "the promise and threat" of Judgment Day ( or ), 
when "all bodies will be resurrected" from the dead, and "all persons" are "called to account" for their deeds and their faith during their life on earth. It has been called "the dominant message" of the holy book of Islam, the Quran, and resurrection and judgement the two themes "central to the understanding of Islamic eschatology".
Judgement Day is considered a fundamental tenet of faith by all Muslims, and one of the six articles of Islamic faith.  

The trials, tribulations and details associated with it are detailed in the Quran and the hadith (sayings of Muhammad); these have been elaborated on in creeds, Quranic commentaries (tafsịrs), theological writing, eschatological manuals to provide more details and a sequence of events on the Day. Islamic expositors and scholarly authorities who have explained the subject in detail include al-Ghazali, Ibn Kathir, Ibn Majah, Muhammad al-Bukhari, and Ibn Khuzaymah.

Names 
Among the names of the Day of Resurrection/Judgement used in the Qur'an are:
—the Earthquake;    Surah 99 is name al-Zalzalah; the word is found in Q.99.1
—the Blast;
—the Hard Day;
—the Encompassing Day;
—the Day of Separation;
—the Great Disaster;
—the Reality;
—the Day of Judgement;
—the True (inevitable) Day;
—the Day of Reckoning;
—the Day of Exodus (from the graves);
—the [Last] Hour is reportedly mentioned 39 times in the Qur’an (54:46, 25:11, 33:63, 30:55, 45:32, 69:2, 79:42, 30:12, 54:1, 43:66, 21:49, 30:14, 22:1, 22:7, 20:15, 40:59, 43:61, 42:17, 12:107, 15:85, 18:36, 45:27, 22:55, 43:85, 47:18, 6:40, 40:46, 42:18, 6:31, 16:77, etc.)
—Day of Resurrection;  Literally means the "rising up at the resurrection" although it "has come to signify the entire series of events to take place" on Judgement day, "although technically " means the actual hour", according to scholars Jane Smith and Yvonne Haddad; 
On the Day of Resurrection (Nay! I do swear by the Day of Resurrection) it is mentioned 70 times in the Qur’an.

Related terms include (according to scholars Jane Smith and Yvonne Haddad), 
 —"The Trumpet"; 
 —the "extinction of all save God". 
  "means the specific gathering together" of resurrected for their judging;    
  "signifies the calling forth for judgment"; 
 —"the return", "the general term used by theologians for the entire process" of resurrection, judgement and consignment to heaven or hell. 
 —the terror of the place of assembly;
 —the time of standing before God before being judged by God.

Similarities to the Judgement Day of Christianity
Islamic and Christian eschatology both have a "Day of Resurrection" of the dead, followed by a "Day of Judgment" where all human beings who have ever lived will be held accountable for their deeds by being judged by God. Depending on the verdict of the judgement, they will be sent for eternity to either the reward of paradise (Jannah) or the punishment of hell (Jahannam).

Some of the similarities between Christian and Islamic eschatology include: when exactly Judgement day will occur will be known only to God; it will be announced by a trumpet blast; it will be preceded by strange and terrible events serving as portents;  Jesus will return to earth (but in different roles); battles will be fought with an AntiChrist and Gog and Magog; righteous believers will not be among the living when the world ends.

The , like the Antichrist, performs miracles, or at least what appear to be miracles.

As in the Christian Book of Revelation (where they are to fight a "final battle with Christ and his saints"), Gog and Magog, will be released, after being imprisoned for thousands of years in a mountain, to wage war against the righteous.  In an event somewhat similar to the Rapture concept in Christianity—where at some time near the end of the world all Christian believers disappear and are carried off to heaven—in Islam one of the very last signs of the imminent arrival of the end of the world will be a "pleasant" or "cold" wind, that brings a peaceful death to all Muslim believers, leaving only unbelievers alive to face the end of the world. Jesus (known in Islam as Isa) will make a second coming in Islam, but not to preside over Last Judgement. Instead he will help another Islamic saviour figure ("The Mahdi), crush evildoers and restore order and justice before the end of the world, including (according to some Islamic hadiths) correcting the erring ways of the world's Christians by converting them to Islam.  (Muslims do not believe these matching prophecies about Judgement Day are a result of Islam imitating Christianity, but that the Abrahamic religions of Judaism, Christianity and Islam resemble each other because God's word has been sent by prophets throughout history to all three groups/religions, but that the first two garbled and corrupted his teachings and that only Teachings of Islam has not been corrupted.)

Events 
The events prophesied for the day of resurrection and judgement "are numerous and presented in varying ways", but "a sequence of the events" for the day  can be made based on both the many details "suggested by the Qur'an" and also on "the elaborations and additions provided as usual by the hadiths, the manuals, and the interpretations of theologians".
Four segments of end times in Islam can be presented :
the signs/portents of "The Hour" and other events heralding the imminent end of the world;
the soundings of the trumpet, the resurrection of the dead, and the gathering together of all living beings;
the reckoning where the resurrected are judged;
the preparation for final consignment to heaven or hell, the crossing of the bridge that the damned fall off of to hell below, and the saved reach the other side, the possibility of intercession (shafā'a) to save sinners from hell.

Portents 

Many verses of the Quran, especially the earlier ones, are dominated by the idea of the nearing of the Day of Resurrection. 
In Islam the signs of the coming of Judgement Day are described as "major" and "minor".  The Al-Masih ad-Dajjal will appear, deceiving the foolish and killing Muslims until killed by either the Mahdi or Jesus.
Following him, two dangerous, evil tribes of subhumans with vast numbers called Yajooj and Majooj will be released from where they have been imprisoned inside a mountain since Roman times.  And according to some narratives, a murderous tyrant called the Sufyani will spread corruption and mischief, killing women, children and descendants  of the Prophet Muhammad. To save believers from these horrors, the Mahdi will appear and Isa bin Maryam (Jesus) will descend from heaven to assist him. The sun will rise from the west. A breeze will blow causing all believers to inhale it and die peacefully.

Destruction and resurrection 

Following these portents, the Earth will be destroyed. (In surah Al-Haqqah)
When the trumpet is blown with a single blast
and the earth and the mountains are lifted up and crushed with a single blow,
then, on that day, the terror shall come to pass,
and heaven shall be split, for upon that day it shall be very frail. ... "
(Q.69:13–16)
Verses from another surah (At-Takwir) describe 
When the sun shall be darkened
When the stars shall be thrown down
When the seas shall be set boiling
When the souls shall be coupled, ...
When the scrolls shall be unrolled
When heavens shall be stripped off,
When Hell shall be set blazing, 
When Paradise shall be brought nigh
Then shall a soul know what it has produced. 
(Q.81:1,2,6,7,10-14)

A second trumpet blast will signal a "final cataclysm", the extinction of all living creatures – even the angel of death himself – save God.
God will then ask three times, "'To whom belongs the Kingdom this day?' No one answers Him so He answers Himself, saying, 'To God who is one alone, victorious!'"  Numerous Qur'ānic mentions that every soul will taste death during "the hour" are thought to underscore the absolute power and tawḥīd of God while the resurrection of life demonstrates "His justice and mercy". The time between annihilation of all life and its resurrection is both "beyond all human time constructs" and generally estimated by many commentators to be forty years.
Resurrection
The Afterlife will commence with a trumpet blast (different sources give different numbers of trumpet blasts), signaling the "Day of the Arising", 
according to the classical Islamic scholar and theologian al-Ghazali.

The sounding of the trumpet is mentioned at least two times in the Qur'ān, but "the Qur'an itself does not make explicit the chronology
involved with the blowing(s) of the horn" and "it has been for the followers of the Prophet to determine for themselves the exact sequence of events after that."

Know that Isrāfīl is the master of the horn []. God created the preserved tablet [] of white pearl. Its length is seven times the distance between the heaven and the earth and it is connected to the Throne. All that exists until the day of resurrection is written on it. Isrāfīl has four wings—one in the East, one in the West, one covering his legs and one shielding his head and face in fear of God. His head is inclined toward the Throne .... No angel is nearer to the throne than Isrāfīl. Seven veils are between him and the Throne, each veil five hundred years distance from the next ...

This will wake the dead from their graves. Bodies will be resurrected and reunited with their spirits to form
"whole, cognizant, and responsible persons".
The first to arise will be the members of the Muslim community, according to "an often-quoted saying" of Muhammad, but will be "subdivided into categories" based on their sins while on earth. (the classification of the resurrected into groups comes from "certain narratives" about Judgement Day that "suggest" the grouping, and are based on "a number of scattered verses in the Qur'an indicating the woeful condition" of resurrected sinners)

In the time between resurrection and judgement will be an agonizing wait (Q.21:103, Q.37:20)  at the place of assembly [], or the time of standing before God
[], giving sinners "ample opportunity to contemplate the imminent recompense for
his past faults" (just as sinners suffer in the grave before Resurrection Day).  The resurrected will gather for "The Perspiration" — a time when all created beings, including men, angels, jinn, devils and animals will sweat, unshaded from the sun, awaiting their fate. 
Sinners and nonbelievers will suffer and sweat longer on this day, which some say will last for "50,000 years" (based on Q.70:4) and others only 1000 (based on Q.32:4).

Judgement 
The final judgment (Reckoning) where God judges each soul for their lives lived on earth, will be "carried out with absolute justice" accepting no excuses, and examine every act and intention—no matter how small, but "through the prerogative of God's merciful will".

Quran verses in Al-Haqqah (surah 69) are thought to refer to the reckoning on Judgement Day:
As for the one who is given his book in his right hand, he will say: Take and read my book.  
I knew that I would be called to account. 
And he will be in a blissful condition (Q.69:19–21) .... 
But as for him who is given his book in his left hand, he will say: Would that my book had not been given to me   
and that I did not know my reckoning! (Q.69:25-26) ...  
[And it will be said] Seize him and bind him and expose 
him to the burning Fire!(Q.69:30-31)

"The book" is thought to refer to an account each person has, chronicling the deeds of their life, good and bad.  Commentators reports "affirm" that each day in a person's life, "one or two angels" begin a new page, inscribing deeds, and that upon completion, the pages are assembled  "in some fashion ... into a full scroll or record". On Judgement Day the book is presented to the right hand of the resurrected person if they are going to Jannah, and left if they are to be sent to "the burning fire".
 
An eschatological manual, states:
The  will be set up on the day of resurrection with the length of each of its shafts the distance between the East and the West. The scale of the  will be like the strata of the earth in length and breadth. One of the two scales will be on the right of the Throne, and it is the scale of good deeds, and the other on the left of the Throne, and it is the scale of wrong deeds. The scales will be piled up like mountains, weighted with good and evil deeds. That day will last for 50,000 years.
It is believed those whose good deeds outweigh their bad will be assigned to Jannah (heaven), and those whose bad deeds outweigh the good, Jahannam (hell). How much weight is given to internal and how much to external imam, how much to piety and how much to obedience to Islamic law (the two being intertwined of course), in the tabulation of good deeds and earning salvation, varies according to the interpretation of scholars. In one manual, hopeful humans are questioned about their behavior not before they head on the path/bridge (see below) to heaven, but during. As they walk the bridge, said to have seven arches, "each 3,000 years in length"; they are interrogated at each arch about a specific religious duty prescribed by the shari'a -- their īmān, their prayer ṣalāt, almsgiving zakāt, pilgrimage ḥajj, ritual washings wudū', ghusl, and responsibility to their relatives", respectively. 

(While there is no Original Sin in Islam, the Quran does mention the many inherent flaws in the personalities of human beings – weakness, greed, stinginess, pride, etc.)
 

What the common order is of Judgement Day at this point is unclear based on hadith as they disagree on the way God reveals to "the various categories of individuals what their fate is to be".

The crossing of the Bridge

The saved and the damned now being clearly distinguished, the souls will traverse over hellfire via the bridge of sirat. This story is based on verses in the Quran (Q.36:66, Q.37:23–24), both of which "are rather indefinite".
˹They will be told,˺ "This is the Day of ˹Final˺ Decision which you used to deny."
˹Allah will say to the angels,˺ "Gather ˹all˺ the wrongdoers along with their peers, and whatever they used to worship
instead of Allah, then lead them ˹all˺ to the path of Hell []. 
And detain them, for they must be questioned."
˹Then they will be asked,˺ "What is the matter with you that you can no longer help each other?"
(Q.37:21–25)
 "was adopted into Islamic tradition
to signify the span over jahannam, the top layer of the Fire". 

Prophet Muhammad leading the Muslim Umma will be first across the bridge.
For sinners, the bridge will be thinner than hair and sharper than the sharpest sword, impossible to walk on without falling below to arrive at their fiery destination, while the righteous will proceed across the bridge to paradise (Jannah).

Intercession 

Not everyone consigned to hell will remain there. Somewhat like the Catholic concept of purgatory, sinful Muslim will stay in hell until purified of their sins. According to the scholar Al-Subki (and others), "God will take out of the Fire everyone who has said the testimony" (i.e. the  testimony made by all Muslims, "There is no God but Allah, Muhammad is his prophet") "all but the mushrikun, those who have committed the worst sin of impugning the tawḥīd of God, have the possibility of being saved."

The possibility of intercession on behalf of sinners (shafaʿa) on Judgement Day to save them from hellfire, is a "major theme" in the eschatological expectations of the Muslim community and in stories told about the events of Judgement Day.

While Quran "is both generally and clearly negative" in regard to the possibility of intercession on behalf of sinners (shafaʿa) on the last day" to save them from hellfire,  (the idea being every individual must take responsibility for their own deeds and acts of faith). However this principle was "modified in the ensuing understanding of the community, and the Prophet Muḥammad was invested with the function of intervening on behalf of the Muslims on the day of judgment". Verse Q.43:86 authorizes "true witnesses" to grant intercession, and in this category "has been found for the inclusion" of Muhammad "as an intercessor for the Muslim community.

"One of the most popular and often-cited" stories about Muḥammad as intercessor ("validating" his ability to intercede) revolves around sinners turning to him after being turned down for intercession by all the other prophets. In  by al-Ghazali, this happens "between the two soundings of the trumpet".

Another story found in  relates
[The Prophet Muḥammad] will come with the prophets and will bring out from the Fire all who used to say "There is no God but God and Muḥammad is the Messenger of God. ... " He will then bring them out all together, charred from the Fire having eaten at them. Then he will hurry with them to a river near the gate of the Garden, called [the river of] life. There they will bathe and emerge from it as beardless youths, with kohled eyes and faces like the moon.

Paradise and Hellfire
The "events" of "the judgment process" are concluded with the arrival of resurrected at their final "abode of recompense": either paradise for the saved or hell for the damned.  The Quran describes habitation within the abodes  in "exquisite detail",
while "a wealth of picturesque specifics" (their shapes, structures, etc.) are elaborated on by hadith and other Islamic literature. Much of Islamic cosmology comes from "earlier world views" (the circles of damnation, seven layers of heaven above the earth, fires of purgation below of Mesopotamian and/or Jewish belief) with Quranic verses interpreted to harmonize with these.

While critics have charged that the concept of afterlife in Islam is "very materialistic", the afterlife punishment of hell and pleasure of heaven are all not only physical, but psychic and spiritual.  
Their characteristics having matching features or direct parallels with each other. 
The pleasure and delights of Jannah described in the Quran, are matched by the excruciating pain and horror of Jahannam,  Both are commonly believed to have seven levels, in both cases, the higher the level, the more desirable—in Jannah the higher the prestige and pleasure, in Jahannam the less the suffering. Both feature prominent trees – the Zaqqum tree of hell opposite
the lote tree of paradise. The common belief among Muslims holds that both abodes coexists with the temporal world, rather than being created after Judgement Day.
  
Paradise

Paradise, Jannah (or 'the garden'), is the final abode of the righteous.   Jannah is described with physical pleasures such as gardens, rivers, fountains; lovely houris that no man has touched before, wine that does not make drunk, and "divine pleasure". Their reward of pleasure will vary according to the righteousness of the person.

Hellfire

Punishment and suffering in hell in mainstream Islam varies according to the sins of the condemned person.  It is commonly believed by Muslims that confinement to hell is temporary for Muslims but not for others.

Hell is described physically in different ways by different sources of Islamic literature. It is enormous in size, and located below heaven. Different sources give different descriptions of its structure. There are seven levels  but it is also said to be a huge pit over which the bridge of As-Sirāt crosses; to have mountains, rivers, valleys and "even oceans" filled with disgusting fluids; and also to be able to walk (controlled by reins), and ask questions, much  like a sentient being.

Literal or figurative interpretation
While early Muslims debated whether scripture on Judgement day should be interpreted literally or figuratively, the school of thought that prevailed (Ashʿarī) "affirmed that such things as" connected with Judgement day as "the individual records of deeds (including the paper, pen, and ink with which they are inscribed), the bridge, the balance, and the pond" are "realities", and "to be understood in a concrete and literal sense." Regarding heaven and hell, today, "the vast majority of believers", (according to Smith and Haddad), understand verses of the Quran on Jannah (and hellfire) "to be real and specific, anticipating them" with joy or terror, although this view "has generally not insisted that the realities of the next world will be identical with those of this world".  On the other hand, since "the time and chronology are less important than the ultimate significance of resurrection and judgement "as a whole", the point of stories of Judgement day in the eschatological manuals is to be "didactic" not accurate, i.e. to raise awareness of "the threat and promise" of the message of Islam even if most of the story is based not on the verses of the Quran but on the author's imagination.  The eschatological manual , for example, describes the Fire/Hell terrifyingly but implausibly as having "four legs (between each leg 1000 years), thirty heads with 30,000 mouths each, lips like 1000 mountains, and so on".

See also 
 Islamic eschatology
 Signs of the coming of Judgement Day
 Jannah
 Jahannam
 Final Judgement
 Eschatology

References

Notes

Citations

Bibliography
 
 
 
 
 
 
 

 
 
 
 
 
 
 
 
 
 
 
 

 
 
 
 
 
 
 
 
 
 {{cite book |last1=Smith|first1= Jane I. |first2= Yvonne Y. |last2=Haddad |date=1981 |title=The Islamic Understanding of Death and Resurrection |location=Albany, N Y |publisher=SUNY Press |url=https://vdoc.pub/download/the-islamic-understanding-of-death-and-resurrection-1fa354cla15g |ref=JISYYHIU1981}}
 
 
 

Further reading
 "Fath al-Bari" (from Sahih al-Bukhari by ibn Hajar al-Asqalani).
 Esposito, John, The Oxford Dictionary of Islam, Oxford University Press, 2003, .
 Richard C. Martin, Said Amir Arjomand, Marcia Hermansen, Abdulkader Tayob, Rochelle Davis, John Obert Voll, Encyclopedia of Islam and the Muslim World, MacMillan Reference Books, 2003, .
 Lawson, Todd (1999). Duality, Opposition and Typology in the Qur'an: The Apocalyptic Substrate''.     Journal of Quranic Studies. 10: 23–49.